The Dictionary of Modern Written Arabic is an Arabic-English dictionary compiled by Hans Wehr and edited by J Milton Cowan.

First published in 1961 by Otto Harrassowitz in Wiesbaden, Germany, it was an enlarged and revised English version of Wehr's German Arabisches Wörterbuch für die Schriftsprache der Gegenwart ("Arabic dictionary for the contemporary written language") (1952) and its Supplement (1959). The Arabic-German dictionary was completed in 1945, but not published until 1952. Writing in the 1960s, a critic commented, "Of all the dictionaries of modern written Arabic, the work [in question] ... is the best." It remains the most widely used Arabic-English dictionary.

The work is compiled on descriptive principles: only words and expressions that are attested in context are included. "It was chiefly based on combing modern works of Arabic literature for lexical items, rather than culling them from medieval Arabic dictionaries, which was what Lane had done in the nineteenth century".

Hans Wehr was a member of the National Socialist (Nazi) Party and argued that the Nazi government should ally with the Arabs against England and France. The Arabic-German dictionary project was funded by the Nazi government, which intended to use it to translate Adolf Hitler's Mein Kampf into Arabic. Despite this, at least one Jewish scholar, Hedwig Klein, contributed to the dictionary.

Besides English speakers, the dictionary is also very popular among Arabic language learners in Japan.

Collation
The dictionary arranges its entries according to the traditional Arabic root order. Foreign words are listed in straight alphabetical order by the letters of the word. Arabicized loanwords, if they can clearly fit under some root, are entered both ways, often with the root entry giving reference to the alphabetical listing.

Under a given root, lexical data are, whenever they exist, arranged in the following sequence:
the perfect of the basic stem (stem I)
vowels of the imperfect of stem I
maṣādir (verbal nouns) of stem I
finite derived stem verb forms, indicated by Roman numerals

Nominal forms then follow according to their length (including those verbal nouns and participles which merit separate listings).  This ordering means that forms derived from the same verb stem (i.e. closely related finite verb forms, verbal nouns, and participles) are not always grouped together (as is done in some other Arabic dictionaries).  The dictionary does not usually give concrete example forms of finite derived stem verbs, so that the user must refer to the introduction in order to know the pattern associated with each of the stem numbers ("II" through "X") and reconstruct such verb forms based solely on the stem number and the abstract consonantal root.

Transcription and orthography
Transcriptions (for specific details, see Hans Wehr transliteration) are provided for the past tense of the basic verb form, for the vowel of the imperfect tense, and for all nouns and particles, but they are not provided for verb forms of the derived stems, except for any irregular forms, the rare XI to XV stems, and the quadriliteral roots. The morphology of the derived stems II-X is regular and is given in Wehr's "Introduction". Other parts of speech such as nouns are fully given transcriptions.

Foreign words are transliterated according to pronunciation, for which Arab students at the University of Münster were consulted. Examples would be مانجو mangō 'mango fruit/tree' and كوري kōrī 'Korean'.

As for the Arabic orthography used, word-initial glottal stops or hamza (i.e. the  vs.  vs.  distinction) are not written either in the Arabic of the entries or in the transliteration. In transliteration systems such as DIN 31635, the first would be transliterated as ʼakala, with an apostrophe representing hamza, and the second as ibn, without an apostrophe. Hamzas in the middle and end of words, however, are written, as in  maʼkal "food".

Editions

Shortly after the publication of the first German version in 1952, the Committee on Language Programs of the American Council of Learned Societies recognized its excellence and sought to publish an English version. The publication of the English edition was financed by the American Council of Learned Societies, the Arabian-American Oil Company, and Cornell University.
The English version of the Wehr dictionary is commonly available in two editions. The so-called 3rd edition was printed by Otto Harrassowitz in Wiesbaden, Hesse, in 1961 (reprinted in 1966, 1971) under the title A Dictionary of Modern Written Arabic: Arabic–English, as well as by Spoken Language Services, Inc. of Ithaca, New York, in 1976, under the somewhat different title Arabic–English Dictionary: The Hans Wehr Dictionary of Modern Written Arabic, Edited by J M. Cowan. Librairie du Liban in Lebanon has printed it since 1980, and it is widely available in the Middle East.

The 4th edition (pictured above), which is considerably amended and enlarged (1301 pages compared to 1110 in the 3rd edition), was published in 1979. Harrassowitz published an improved English translation of the 4th edition of the Arabic-German dictionary with over 13,000 additional entries, approx. 26,000 words with approx. 20 words per page. It was published in 1994 by Spoken Language Services, Inc. of Ithaca, New York, and is usually available in the United States as a compact "student" paperback. In 2019, a two-volume version also started being offered.

The 5th edition available in German, published by Harrassowitz's publishing house in 1985, also in the city of Wiesbaden, under the title Arabisches Wörterbuch für die Schriftsprache der Gegenwart: Arabisch–Deutsch, unter Mitwirkung von Lorenz Kropfitsch neu bearbeitet und erweitert. It has 1452 pages of dictionary entries.

The 6th edition in German was published by Harrassowitz in December 2020, which was significantly expanded and comprehensively edited by Lorenz Kropfitsch. This edition was created that only has the basic set of lexemes in common with the previous edition. The Arabist and lexicographer Dr. Lorenz Kropfitsch, who taught Arabic at the FTSK Germersheim for decades, passed away on January 5, 2020 at the age of 73.

See also
Classical Arabic
Academy of the Arabic Language
Arabic phonology
Romanization of Arabic
Help:IPA/Arabic
Varieties of Arabic

Notes

References
Irwin, Robert (2006). For Lust of Knowing. London: Allen Lane.
Sa'id, Majed F. (1962). "Review of A Dictionary of Modern Written Arabic by Hans Wehr, J Milton Cowan". Language 38 (3): 328-330. (Available online through JSTOR)
Wehr, Hans (1976). "Introduction", in Hans Wehr & J M. Cowan Arabic–English Dictionary, pp. vii–xv. Ithaca, N.Y.: Spoken Language Services.
Haywood, John. Reviewed Work: A Dictionary of Modern Written Arabic (Arabic-English) by Hans Wehr, J. Milton Cowan, Die Welt Des Islams, vol. 20, no. 3/4, 1980, pp. 246–248.

1961 non-fiction books
Arabic dictionaries
English bilingual dictionaries
Translation dictionaries
Harrassowitz Verlag books